The NBC sitcom My Name Is Earl ran from September 20, 2005 to May 14, 2009 for a total of four seasons, and 96 episodes.

Series overview
{| class="wikitable plainrowheaders" style="text-align:center;"
|-
! colspan="2" rowspan="2" |Season
! rowspan="2" |Episodes
! colspan="2" |Originally aired
|-
! First aired
! Last aired
|-
| style="background: #c7c5a4;"|
| [[List of My Name Is Earl episodes#Season 1 (2005–06)|1]]
| 24
| September 20, 2005
| May 11, 2006
|-
| style="background: #8de1ff;"|
| [[List of My Name Is Earl episodes#Season 2 (2006–07)|2]]
| 23
| September 21, 2006
| May 10, 2007
|-
| style="background: #f6ff82;"|
| [[List of My Name Is Earl episodes#Season 3 (2007–08)|3]]
| 22
| September 27, 2007
| May 15, 2008
|-
| style="background: #2f4d83;"|
| [[List of My Name Is Earl episodes#Season 4 (2008–09)|4]]
| 27
| September 25, 2008
| May 14, 2009
|}

Episodes

Season 1 (2005–06)

Season 2 (2006–07)

Season 3 (2007–08)

Season 4 (2008–09)

External links

List of My Name Is Earl episodes at the Internet Movie Database
List of all the songs played in the series by episodes at the TV IV

Lists of American sitcom episodes
Episode